The climate of Italy is the long-term weather pattern in the territory of the Italian Republic. The climate of Italy is influenced by the large body of water of the Mediterranean Seas that surrounds Italy on every side except the north. These seas constitute a reservoir of heat and humidity for Italy. Within the southern temperate zone, they determine a particular climate called Mediterranean climate with local differences due to the geomorphology of the territory, which tends to make its mitigating effects felt, especially in high pressure conditions.

Because of the length of the peninsula and the mostly mountainous hinterland, the climate of Italy is highly diverse. In most of the inland northern and central regions, the climate ranges from humid subtropical to humid continental and oceanic. The climate of the Po valley geographical region is mostly humid subtropical, with cool winters and hot summers. The coastal areas of Liguria, Tuscany and most of the South generally fit the Mediterranean climate stereotype (Köppen climate classification).

Temperature differences are less extreme in the summer.

Generality 

The Italian climate is influenced by the large body of water of the Mediterranean Seas that surrounds Italy on every side except the north. These seas constitute a reservoir of heat and humidity for Italy. Within the southern temperate zone, they determine a Mediterranean climate with local differences due to the geomorphology of the territory, which tends to make its mitigating effects felt, especially in high pressure conditions.

In addition to Mediterranean influences, the Italian climate is partly affected by the western currents, especially in the intermediate seasons, also by the dynamics in the Atlantic Ocean, with its cyclones that travel from west to east, driven by the zonal circulation and more generally by the reciprocal position, on a synoptic level, of the Azores anticyclone and the African subtropical anticyclone. The cold winter airs, are in part influenced by the mountain ranges of the Alps and the Apennines. The mitigating effect of the Mediterranean is added to this condition with a tendency to reinvigorate, due to the transfer of sensible heat and humidity, the weakened perturbations from the west or with the formation of Mediterranean Low or Mediterranean cyclogenesis.

Description
Conditions on the coast are different from those in the interior, particularly during winter months when the higher altitudes tend to be cold, wet, and often snowy. The coastal regions have mild winters and warm and generally dry summers, although lowland valleys can be quite hot in summer.
Winters can vary widely across the country with lingering cold, foggy and snowy periods in the north and milder, sunnier conditions in the south. Summers can be hot and humid across the country, particularly in the south while northern and central areas can experience occasional strong thunderstorms from spring to autumn.

The east coast of the Italian peninsula is not as wet as the west coast, but is usually colder in the winter. The east coast north of Pescara is occasionally affected by the cold bora winds in winter and spring, but the wind is less strong here than around Trieste. During these frosty spells from E–NE cities like Rimini, Ancona, Pescara and the entire eastern hillside of the Apennines can be affected by true "blizzards".

On the coast from Ravenna to Venice and Trieste, snow falls more rarely: during cold spells from the east, the cold wind can be harsh but with bright skies. During the snowfalls that affect Northern Italy, the Adriatic coast can see a milder Sirocco wind which makes snow turn to rain. The mild effects of this wind often disappear just a few kilometres inside the plain, and sometimes the coast from Venice to Jesolo sees snow while it is raining in Trieste and surroundings, the Po River mouths and Ravenna. Rarely, the city of Trieste has seen snow blizzards with north-eastern winds. In the colder winters, the Venice Lagoon may freeze, and in the coldest ones even enough to walk on the ice sheet (December 1788). Further south, snow may occur inland but it rarely happens at sea level. However, snow at sea level has been recorded as far south as Sicily. Winters are generally milder in the coastal areas of the south, Sicily and Sardinia. The west coast of Italy has rainier winters while the east is more exposed to the cold Bora winds.

Summer is usually more stable, although the northern regions often have thunderstorms in the afternoon/night hours and some grey and rainy days. So, while south of Florence the summer is typically dry and sunny, in the north it tends to be more humid and cloudy. Even if the temperatures are similar throughout the country, the humidity can make the northern plains particularly uncomfortable. Hot weather can occur practically anywhere in Italy during the summer months. Spring and autumn weather can be very changeable, with sunny and warm weeks (sometimes with summer-like temperatures) suddenly broken off by cold spells or followed by rainy and cloudy weeks.

Sunshine duration, solar irradiance and cloud cover 

Based on the maps on sunshine duration and on global solar irradiance in Italy, the areas with the highest values ​​are the coasts of Sardinia, the western and southern coastal strip of Sicily, the whole of Apulia south of Bari, and the coastal strips of the southern Tuscan Archipelago. All these areas have values ​​of more than 2,600 hours of sunshine per year, with an average of more than seven hours per day.

On average, the northern and eastern coastal strip of Sicily, the innermost areas of Sardinia, the entire western peninsular coast to the south of Livorno, including the flat and hilly areas of the hinterland, the Ionian coast between Calabria and Basilicata, the inland areas of Lucania, the Adriatic coasts of Molise and the whole of northern Apulia, receive between 2,400 and 2,600 hours of sunshine per year (between 6.5 and seven hours per day).

Values between 2,200 and 2,400 hours of sunshine per year (between 6 and 6.5 hours per day) are recorded in the innermost areas of Sicily, in some sections of the Calabrian Ionian coast and in the corresponding inland areas, along the Adriatic coast of Abruzzo, in Liguria, Versilia, inland areas of northern and eastern Tuscany, in Umbria and in the hinterland of southern Lazio and Campania. All the other areas north of the imaginary oblique transversal line, drawn between the area immediately north of the city of Genoa and the border between Marche and Abruzzo, record annual average values ​​that do not reach 2,200 hours, or less than six hours per day.

Cloud cover generally tends to reach the lowest average values ​​in the month of July, while the highest average values, according to the different climatic zones, can affect several months between late autumn and the first part of spring, with the highest average values ​​in most of the territory recorded in November.

Precipitation 

In the south, summer marks a distinct dry season, characteristic of Mediterranean climates. This includes cities such as Naples, Rome, Bari, and Palermo. In the north, precipitation is more evenly distributed during the year, although the summer is usually slightly wetter. Between November and March the Po valley is often covered by fog, especially in the central zone (Pavia, Piacenza, Cremona and Mantua), while the number of days with lows below  is usually from 60 to 90 a year, with peaks of 100–110 days in the mainly rural zones.

Snow is quite common between early December and early March in cities like Turin, Milan and Bologna, but sometimes it appears in late November or late March and even April.

Often, the largest snowfalls happen in February, sometime in January or March.

On the highest peaks of the Alps, snow may fall even during mid summer, and glaciers are present.

Temperatures 

Summer temperatures are often similar north to south. Thunderstorms, while much more common in the humid north, occasionally also occur in the south. High humidity may keep nighttime temperatures high in Italy's cities during the summer months.

In cities like Rome and Milan, strong heat islands can exist, so that inside the urban area, winters can be milder and summers more sultry.

Climates found in Italy

Hot semi-arid climate (Bsh)
It is found in some areas of Apulia, Sicily and Sardinia, for example in Villasimius.

Cold semi-arid climate (Bsk)
It is found in some areas of Alps, for example in Bardonecchia.

Hot-summer Mediterranean climate (Csa)
It is found in all the coastal areas, excluding the north-eastern area and the area of Liguria from Genoa to Savona, which have a Humid subtropical climate. During the summer, averages are near  in the north (Liguria) and sometimes reach  in the south. Precipitation mostly occurs during the winter. Snowfalls are rare and usually very light in the north, and almost never happen in the south. Summers are dry and hot. Main cities: Cagliari, Palermo, Naples, Rome, Pescara.

Warm-summer Mediterranean climate (Csb)

Snowfalls are more common. Main cities and towns: Ariano Irpino, Potenza, San Giovanni in Fiore, Prizzi.

Humid subtropical climate (Cfa)

A relatively "continental" and "four-season" version of the humid subtropical Cfa climate can be found in the Po and Adige valleys in the North, and sometime in low inland Central and Southern Italy. It is marked by hot and wet summers, while winters are moderately cold. The precipitation is higher and there is no dry season. Average temperatures are around 1 °C to 3 °C in January, and more than 22 °C in July and August. Main cities: Milan,  Genoa, Venice, Verona, Turin, Trieste, Bologna.

Transition between Cfa and Csa climates

Some parts of Italy have a climate which cannot be precisely defined as either Cfa or Csa, presenting elements from both (e.g. summers are not wet enough for Cfa, nor so dry as in Csa; while winters are colder than similar Italian cities of Csa climate, but at the same time milder than in Cfa places). This indeed allows cultivations not seen in the Padana Plain, like olive trees, while keeping those characteristics which are not typical of Mediterranean climates (like more frequent appearances of frost during winters or more frequent summer thunderstorms). This can be found both in some lake and hill resorts of Northern Italy (usually with wetter summers) and in some area like inner Tuscany (usually with drier summers). Florence is a good example of this transition climate:

Oceanic climate (Cfb)

It can be found in altitude in the Apennines and in the alpine foothills. Summers are between  Main cities and towns: Aosta, Campobasso, L'Aquila, Cuneo, Sondrio, Amatrice – mild.
Belluno, Breno, Feltre – severe.

Subpolar oceanic climate (Cfc)
It can be found mainly in the valleys of the Alps and to a lesser extent in the Apennines. Main cities and towns: Tarvisio, Bormio, Cortina d'Ampezzo.

Humid continental climate (Dfb)

Snow is usual from early November until March or early April. Main towns: Brusson, Gressoney-Saint-Jean, Aprica, Vermiglio, Mazzin, Santo Stefano di Cadore, Asiago, Claut, Resia.

Warm-summer mediterranean continental climate (Dsb) 
It is found at lower altitudes on the slopes of Mount Etna, Sicily, for example in Zafferana Etnea.

Dry-summer subarctic climate (Dsc) 
It is found at higher altitudes on the slopes of Mount Etna, Sicily, for example in Nicolosi.

Subarctic climate (Dfc)
Main towns and villages in this area: Livigno, Chamois, Misurina, Predoi, Rhêmes-Notre-Dame.

Tundra climate (ET)
Above the tree line in the Alps. All the months with average below .
Villages with this climate: Cervinia, Sestriere, Trepalle.

Ice cap climate (EF) 
On Plateau Rosa there is a meteorological station managed by the Italian Air Force.

Extremes

However, there are many daily rainfall records around Italy exceeding . 

There are three candidates for the highest temperature:  recorded in Foggia in Apulia on 25 June 2007, and  recorded in Catenanuova in Sicily on 10 August 1999. The latter is not official, and generally considered dubious.

Historical climate change in Italy

Italy, like other parts of the globe, has been subject in the past to climate changes on a planetary scale (for example glaciations and interglacial periods, Little Ice Age). The current climate changes (global warming) have also involved Italy. 

In particular, compared to the 1960s and 1970s, in which even on a global level there was a slight cooling of the climate (dominated in Europe by the Azores anticyclone and the Russian-Siberian anticyclone), from the mid-1980s onwards there was a recorded increase in the average temperature with increasing influence of the African subtropical anticyclone starting from the 2000s and an increase in extreme phenomena such as heat waves, alluviums and retreat of alpine glaciers.

Global warming 
Italy is particularly at risk in the current climate change as it is in a transition area between North Africa and Continental Europe. Experts have highlighted the risk of desertification in the southern regions and tropicalization of the climate in the remaining areas of the country partial confirmation was obtained starting from the 2010s with an acceleration of the water cycle and an increase in alluvial phenomena and the tropicalization of the Mediterranean Sea.

See also 

 Climate of Ancient Rome
 Geography of Italy

References

External links 
Average climatic data of cities in Italy

 
Italy